Rijckloff van Goens Jr. was a Governor of Dutch Ceylon during the its Dutch period.

He was appointed in 1675 and was Governor until 1680. He was succeeded by Laurens van Pyl.

Footnotes 

17th-century Dutch colonial governors
Governors of Dutch Ceylon